Zef (Afrikaans: [ˈzɛf]) is a South African counter-culture movement. Zef or ZEF may also refer to
Zef (name), Albanian masculine given name, a short form of Yossef or Joseph
Elkin Municipal Airport in North Carolina, United States (location identifier ZEF)
ZEF, an acronym, standing for zygote, embryo and fetus (the three stages of prenatal development)